John McClintock may refer to:

 John McClintock (police commissioner) (1874–?), Police Commissioner of New York City
 John McClintock (1743–1799), Irish MP for Enniskillen 1783–1790, for Belturbet 1790–1797
 John McClintock (theologian) (1814–1870), American Methodist Episcopal theologian and educationalist
 John McClintock, 1st Baron Rathdonnell (1798–1879), Irish peer and Conservative Member of Parliament
 John McClintock (1770–1855), Irish MP for Athlone 1820, for County Louth 1830–31
 John McClintock (Royal Navy officer) (1874–1929), British admiral